Yiu Hok Man (born 9 February 1978) is a former Hong Kong professional footballer who played as a midfielder,  winger or forward.

Club career
In 1997, Yiu won the 1996–97 Hong Kong Best Player award. In 2001, he signed for Hong Kong top flight side Sun Hei, helping them win their first league title. In 2002, he signed for Fire Services in the Hong Kong second tier, helping them earn promotion to the Hong Kong top flight. In 2011, he signed for Macau club Hoi Fan. 

In 2012, Yiu signed for Eastern in the Hong Kong top flight, where he made 30 appearances and scored 3 goals and helped them win the 2014–15 Hong Kong Senior Challenge Shield and 2013–14 Hong Kong FA Cup. On 1 September 2013, he debuted for Eastern during a 2–1 win over Tuen Mun. On 7 December 2014, Yiu scored his first 3 goals for Eastern during a 7–1 win over Tai Po. After that, he signed for Hong Kong third tier team St Joseph's.

References

External links

 

1978 births
Association football forwards
Association football midfielders
Association football wingers
Double Flower FA players
Eastern Sports Club footballers
Expatriate footballers in Macau
G.D. Lam Pak players
Hong Kong expatriate footballers
Hong Kong First Division League players
Hong Kong footballers
Hong Kong international footballers
Hong Kong Premier League players
Hong Kong Rangers FC players
Mutual FC players
Resources Capital FC players
Sun Hei SC players
Living people
Hong Kong expatriate sportspeople in Macau
Hong Kong expatriate sportspeople in China
Expatriate footballers in China